The 7th Canadian Parliament was in session from April 29, 1891, until April 24, 1896. The membership was set by the 1891 federal election on March 5, 1891. It was dissolved prior to the 1896 election.

It was controlled by a Conservative/Liberal-Conservative majority first under Prime Minister Sir John A. Macdonald and the 3rd Canadian Ministry, and then by Sir John Abbott and the 4th Canadian Ministry, Sir John Thompson and the 5th Canadian Ministry, Sir Mackenzie Bowell and the 6th Canadian Ministry, and finally Sir Charles Tupper and the 7th Canadian Ministry.  The Official Opposition was the Liberal Party, led by Wilfrid Laurier.

The Speaker was Peter White.  See also List of Canadian electoral districts 1887-1892 for a list of the ridings in this parliament.

It was the second longest parliament in Canadian history.

Having five different people serve as prime minister during one parliament is easily a record for Canada; no other parliament has had more than two.

There were six sessions of the 7th Parliament:

List of members

Following is a full list of members of the seventh Parliament listed first by province, then by electoral district.

Electoral districts denoted by an asterisk (*) indicates that district was represented by two members.

British Columbia

Manitoba

New Brunswick

Northwest Territories

Nova Scotia

Ontario

Prince Edward Island

Quebec

By-elections

References

Succession

1891 establishments in Canada
1896 disestablishments in Canada
1891 in Canada
1892 in Canada
1893 in Canada
1894 in Canada
1895 in Canada
1896 in Canada
07th Canadian parliament